Billy Idol is the debut studio album by English rock singer Billy Idol, released on 16 July 1982 by Chrysalis Records. After the breakup of the band Generation X and the release of his first solo extended play, Don't Stop (1981), Idol began working on his debut album. Produced by Keith Forsey, Billy Idol is a rock album with strong influences of new wave music.

Upon its release, the album received generally positive reviews from music critics and was a commercial success, peaking at number forty-five on the Billboard 200. Billy Idol was certified gold by the Recording Industry Association of America (RIAA).

Three singles were released from the album: "Dancing with Myself" was already released in 1981 as Idol's debut single. The lead single, "Hot in the City", peaked at number twenty-three on the Billboard 100. "White Wedding" was released as the album's second single. After it peaked at number three on Mainstream Rock chart in 1983, the album was reissued with an addition of the earlier single "Dancing with Myself". The song "White Wedding (Part 1)" is so-named due to the less-heard "White Wedding (Part 2)", which is a more synthesiser-based continuation of the first part. It can be heard on the 12-inch version of the single and the compilation Vital Idol (1985).

"Hot in the City" was originally recorded for Idol's debut EP Don't Stop, but his label Chrysalis considered it too good just to release as part of the EP. They felt it could be a single and decided to keep it for the album.

Track listing

Track 11 recorded September 1980, AIR Studios, London.

Personnel
Musicians
Billy Idol – vocals, guitar
Steve Stevens – guitars, keyboards, synthesizer, bass (track 6)
Phil Feit – bass (tracks 1–5, 7–10)
Steve Missal – drums (tracks 1, 4–5, 7–10)

Additional musicians
Stephanie Spruill – backing vocals
Keith Forsey – drums (tracks 2, 3 and 6)
Ashley Otten – guitar (track 3)
Mick Smiley – bass (track 3)
Steve New − guitar (track 11)
Steve Jones − guitar (track 11) 
Tony James – bass (track 11) 
Terry Chimes – drums (track 11)

Technical
Keith Forsey – producer
Brian Reeves – engineer
Nigel Walker – engineer (track 11)
Steve Bates – assistant engineer
Brian Gardner – mastering
Jules Bates – photography
Perri Lister – make-up
Janet Levinson – design
Steve Stevens – arrangements
Billy Idol – arrangements

Charts

Weekly charts

Year-end charts

Certifications

References

Bibliography

External links
[ Billy Idol] at AllMusic

Billy Idol albums
1982 debut albums
Chrysalis Records albums
Albums produced by Keith Forsey